The August Schell Brewing Company is a brewing company in New Ulm, Minnesota that was founded by German immigrant August Schell in 1860.
 It is the second oldest family-owned brewery in America (after D. G. Yuengling & Son) and became the oldest and largest brewery in Minnesota when the company bought the Grain Belt rights in 2002. In September 2010, the brewery celebrated its 150th Anniversary with a two-day festival. Every year, Schell's also celebrates traditional German holidays with Bock Fest and Oktoberfest. The current brewery is owned and operated by the August Schell Brewing Company, a Minnesota corporation that was incorporated in 1902.

History 
August Schell (February 15, 1828, in Durbach, Grand Duchy of Baden – September 20, 1891, in New Ulm, Minnesota) emigrated to the United States in 1848. He worked in Cincinnati as a machinist before relocating to New Ulm with other members of the Turner Society. Upon moving to New Ulm, building on his experience as a machinist, he established a mill. In 1860, August Schell partnered with Jacob Bernhardt to found a brewery to serve the growing German immigrant population in the area. August and Jacob selected a site two miles from the heart of New Ulm along the Cottonwood River. While much of the city of New Ulm was damaged or burned during the Dakota War of 1865, the brewery escaped intact. In 1866, August Schell bought out his partner Jacob Bernahrdt to take sole ownership of the brewery, starting an unbroken chain of family ownership that continues to this day. During this time, the brewery grew in size and production.

August Schell died in 1891 leaving the brewery to his wife Theresa Schell. Their son Otto took over managing the brewery. Otto had studied brewing back in the Schells' home country of Germany. As the 19th century became the 20th, Otto continued to modernize the brewery by adding refrigeration to the brewery. 1911 was a tragic year for the Schell family as first Otto and then Theresa died. At that time, George Marti, the husband of August's daughter Emma, took over managing and operating the brewery.

1919 brought about the passage of the 18th Amendment to the Constitution of the United States and implementation of Prohibition. The August Schell Brewing Company struggled along with many other American breweries. The brewery transitioned to producing "near-beer" (a low alcohol beer still permitted during Prohibition), soft drinks, and candy. Prohibition ended in 1933 with passage of the 21st Amendment. George Marti had successfully steered the brewery through Prohibition, but died shortly thereafter in 1934.

George's son Alfred ("Al") Marti became the President and Manager of the brewery upon the death of his father. Al ran the brewery until 1969 until he retired and passed leadership of the company to his son Warren Marti. During this time, the brewing industry was going through a period of consolidation and upheaval, and Schell's was not immune. At one point, the brewery only managed to keep its doors open by cutting down a large black walnut tree located on the grounds of the brewery and sold its lumber. During Warren's tenure, the brewery responded to its customers changing preferences by introducing Schell's Export Beer, Schell's Light Beer, and 1919 Root Beer (named after the year prohibition was implemented).

In 1984, Warren's son Ted Marti took over operations of the brewery and became President of the brewery in 1985. Having studied at the Siebels Institute of Brewing, Ted began expanding the line of beers offered by the Schell's Brewery. One of those beers, Schell's Pilsener, earned a gold medal at the Great American Beer Festival in 1988. Schell's continued to expand its beer offerings through the 1990s, brewing 38 different beers over that decade.

In 2002, Schell's Brewery expanded its reach by acquiring the recipe and branding for Grain Belt Beer. Upon moving production to its New Ulm Brewery, Schell's introduced additional Grain Belt varieties including Grain Belt Nordeast in 2010, Grain Belt Lock & Dam in 2016 (since retired), Grain Belt BLU in 2018 (after appearing at the Minnesota State Fair for several years), and Grain Belt Southwest Cerveza in 2019.

The next generation of the Marti family is increasing its involvement in the management and operation of the brewery. Ted's oldest son Jace Marti became a brewmaster in 2010 and has taken the lead on producing Schell's Noble Star line of sour Berliner Weisse beers. The brewery opened the Starkeller facility on the North side of New Ulm to produce the Noble Star line. This facility also houses a tap room dedicated to these sour ales.

The brewery has continued to update its offerings by retiring long time brews such as Maifest, Schmaltz's Alt, and Pils among others, while adding an IPA, a Kolsch and Cream Ale. In 2020, it is expected that the brewery will release a line of hard seltzers as Grain Belt N'icebreakers as well as a low calorie Grain Belt Elite.

Brewery 
The historic Schell's brewery is located in New Ulm, Minnesota alongside the Cottonwood River. The brewery has grown and evolved over the decades to accommodate new technology and expanded production lines. In addition to serving as a production facility, the brewery grounds house the historic Schell's mansion, a gift shop, a beer garden, and a white-tailed deer enclosure.

See also
 Barrel-aged beer

References

External links
Historic American Engineering Record (HAER) documentation, filed under Twentieth Street South, New Ulm, Brown County, MN:

Beer brewing companies based in Minnesota
Buildings and structures in Brown County, Minnesota
New Ulm, Minnesota
German-American culture in Minnesota
Historic American Engineering Record in Minnesota
Industrial buildings and structures on the National Register of Historic Places in Minnesota
National Register of Historic Places in Brown County, Minnesota
1860 establishments in Minnesota
Brewery buildings in the United States
Family-owned companies of the United States